Guillermo Rossell de la Lama (c. 1925 – September 6, 2010) was a Mexican politician who served as the Secretary of Tourism from 1976 to 1980. Rossell de la Lama became the Governor of Hidalgo on April 1, 1981, serving until March 31, 1987.

Guillermo Rossell de la Lama died in Mexico City on September 6, 2010, at the age of 85.

References

2010 deaths
Governors of Hidalgo (state)
Mexican Secretaries of Tourism
Institutional Revolutionary Party politicians
Year of birth uncertain
20th-century Mexican politicians
Politicians from Hidalgo (state)
Members of the Senate of the Republic (Mexico)